Yekan may refer to:
 Yekan, Armenia
 Yekan-e Kahriz, Iran
 Yekan-e Olya, Iran
 Yekan-e Sadi, Iran

See also 
 Yakan (disambiguation)